DZBS (1368 AM) Radyo Ronda is a radio station owned and operated by the Radio Philippines Network. It serves as the flagship station of the Radyo Ronda network. The station's studios are located at A205 Lopez Bldg., Session Rd., Baguio, while its transmitter is located at Sitio Lamut, Brgy. Beckel, La Trinidad, Benguet.

References

Radio stations in Baguio
Radio Philippines Network
RPN News and Public Affairs
Radio stations established in 1961
News and talk radio stations in the Philippines